The  is a breed of hunting dog from Japan. A small-to-medium breed, it is the smallest of the six original and distinct spitz breeds of dog native to Japan. Its name literally translates to "brushwood dog", as it is used to flush game.

A small, alert, and agile dog that copes very well with mountainous terrain and hiking trails, the Shiba Inu was originally bred for hunting. It looks similar to and is often mistaken for other Japanese dog breeds such as the Akita Inu or Hokkaido, but the Shiba Inu is a different breed with a distinct blood line, temperament, and smaller size than other Japanese dog breeds.

Appearance
The Shiba's frame is compact with well-developed muscles.

The Shiba Inu is double coated, with the outer coat being stiff and straight and the undercoat soft and thick. Fur is short and even on the foxlike face, ears, and legs. The purpose of the guard hairs is to protect their underlying skin and to repel rain or snow. Tail hair is slightly longer and stands open in a brush.

Their tails are a defining characteristic and makes them stand apart from other dog breeds. The cream color is considered a "major fault" by both the Japan Kennel Club and American Kennel Club.

Conversely, a white (cream) coat is perfectly acceptable according to the British Kennel Club breed standard.

The urajiro (cream to white ventral color) is required in the following areas on all coat colors: on the sides of the muzzle, on the cheeks, inside the ears, on the underjaw and upper throat inside of legs, on the abdomen, around the vent and the ventral side of the tail. On reds: commonly on the throat, fore chest, and chest. On blacks and sesames: commonly as a triangular mark on both sides of the fore chest.

Temperament

Shibas tend to exhibit an independent nature. From the Japanese breed standard:

The dog has a spirited boldness and is fiercely proud with a good nature and a feeling of artlessness. The Shiba is able to move quickly with nimble, elastic steps.

The Shiba is a relatively fastidious breed and feels the need to maintain itself in a clean state. They can often be seen licking their paws and legs, much as cats do. They generally go out of their way to keep their coats clean. Because of their fastidious and proud nature, Shiba puppies are easy to housetrain and in many cases will housebreak themselves. Having their owner simply place them outside after meal times and naps is generally enough to teach the Shiba the appropriate method of toileting.

A distinguishing characteristic of the breed is the so-called "shiba scream". When sufficiently provoked or unhappy, the dog will produce a loud, high-pitched scream. This can occur when attempting to handle the dog in a way that it deems unacceptable.

History

The Shiba Inu has been identified as a basal breed that predates the emergence of the modern breeds in the 19th century. Dogs with a similar appearance to the Shiba Inu were represented in dogū made during the prehistoric Jōmon period of Japanese history.

The Shiba Inu was bred to hunt and flush small game, such as birds and rabbits. Shiba lived in the mountainous areas of the Chūbu region. During the Meiji Restoration, western dog breeds were imported and crosses between these and native Japanese breeds became popular. From 1912 to 1926, almost no pure Shiba remained. From around 1928, hunters and intellectuals began to show interest in the protection of the remaining pure Shiba.

Despite efforts to preserve the breed, the Shiba nearly became extinct during World War II due to a combination of food shortage and a post-war distemper epidemic. All subsequent dogs were bred from the only three surviving bloodlines. These bloodlines were the Shinshu Shiba from Nagano Prefecture, the Mino Shiba from the former Mino Province in the south of present-day Gifu Prefecture, and the San'in Shiba from Tottori and Shimane Prefectures.

The Shinshu Shibas possessed a solid undercoat, with a dense layer of guard-hairs, and were small and red in color. The Mino Shibas tended to have thick, prick ears, and possessed a sickle tail, rather than the common curled tail found on most modern Shibas. The San'in Shibas were larger than most modern shibas, and tended to be black, without the common tan and white accents found on modern black-and-tan shibas.

When the study of Japanese dogs was formalized in the early and mid-20th century, these three strains were combined into one overall breed, the Shiba Inu. The first Japanese breed standard for the Shiba, the Nippo Standard, was published in 1934. In December 1936, the Shiba Inu was recognized as a Natural Monument of Japan through the Cultural Properties Act, largely due to the efforts of Nippo (Nihon Ken Hozonkai), the Association for the Preservation of the Japanese Dog.

In 1954, an armed service family brought the first Shiba Inu to the United States. In 1979, the first recorded litter was born in the United States. The Shiba was recognized by the American Kennel Club in 1992 and added to the AKC Non-Sporting Group in 1993. It is now primarily kept as a pet both in Japan and abroad. According to the American Kennel Club, the Shiba Inu is the number one companion dog in Japan. In the United States, the growing popularity of the Shiba Inu is evident as the American Kennel Club Registration Statistics ranked the breed in 44th place in 2016, a rise from 50th place in 2012.

Health

Overall, the Shiba Inu is a healthy dog breed. Health conditions known to affect this breed are allergies, glaucoma, cataracts, hip dysplasia, entropion, and luxating patella. Periodic joint examinations are recommended throughout the dog's life.  Eye tests should be performed yearly as eye problems can develop over time. By two years of age, Shiba Inus may be considered fully free from joint problems if none have previously been discovered, since at this age the skeleton is fully developed.

As with most dog breeds, Shibas should be walked or otherwise exercised daily.

Life span
Their average life expectancy is from 12 to 15 years. Exercise, especially daily walks, is preferred for this breed to live a long and healthy life. The oldest known Shiba, Pusuke, died at age 26 in early December 2011. Pusuke was the oldest dog alive at the time and lived three years less than the world record for the longest living dog.

Grooming
Shiba Inus are very clean, so grooming needs will likely be minimal. They naturally tend to hate to be wet or bathed, thus, it is very important to get them accustomed when they are young. They have a thick undercoat that can protect them from temperatures well below freezing.

Shedding, also known as blowing coat, can be a nuisance. Shedding is heaviest during the seasonal change and particularly during the summer season, but daily brushing can temper this problem. It is recommended that owners never shave or cut the coat of a Shiba Inu, as the coat is needed to protect them from both cold and hot temperatures.

In popular culture 
Despite not being a popular dog breed outside of Japan, Shiba Inu has become popular on the Internet. Doge is an Internet meme from 2013 including a Shiba Inu and broken English. A popular cryptocurrency, Dogecoin, is named after this meme and its logo bears an image of the Shiba Inu. According to Jamie Cohen, an assistant professor of media studies at Queens College of the City University of New York, the Shiba Inu breed has had a significant presence in online culture since at least 2010.

See also

 List of dog breeds
 Japan Kennel Club
 Mameshiba
 Nihon Ken Hozonkai
 Shiba Inu Puppy Cam

References

External links

 

Dog breeds originating in Japan
FCI breeds
Spitz breeds